Stella Rose Bennett (born 30 January 2000), better known as Benee (stylised in all caps; pronounced ) and formerly Bene, is a New Zealand singer and songwriter from Auckland. In both 2019 and 2020, she consecutively won Single of the Year, Best Solo Artist and Best Pop Artist at the New Zealand Music Awards. Benee initially gained local prominence with her singles "Glitter" and "Soaked", before her 2019 single "Supalonely" saw international popularity following its success on the video-sharing platform TikTok and YouTube. Benee subsequently released her debut album, Hey U X, in November 2020.

Under the moniker of Bene, she made her solo debut with the 2017 single "Tough Guy", before later gaining prominence with her 2018 single "Soaked", which has been certified double-platinum in New Zealand. She released her debut EP, Fire on Marzz, with help from producer Josh Fountain in June 2019. Her second EP, Stella & Steve, was released in November 2019 and charted in the US, Canada and France as a result of the international success of the EP's final single, "Supalonely". Since 2018, Benee has earned five entries on the Triple J Hottest 100, three of which were in the 2019 list. She also released her third EP, Lychee, in March 2022 which charted at number 13 on the Official New Zealand Music Chart.

Life and career

2000–2017: Early life
Stella Rose Bennett was born and raised in the suburb of Grey Lynn in Auckland. She grew up in a "really musical" family with parents who would expose her to the catalogs of Radiohead, Björk and Groove Armada. From the age of eight, Benee began taking guitar lessons in primary school before starting saxophone lessons in high school. Eventually, Benee dropped all music in order to prioritise water polo. She claims it "was [her] life" and that she at one point hoped to represent New Zealand competitively. Benee later became interested in writing and recording music at the age of 17, after deciding that she did not want to pursue a career in water polo. Benee attended an all girls Catholic school, St Mary's College, where music was compulsory for four years.

2017–2018: Online beginnings and solo debut 
Benee began her music career by posting covers to SoundCloud, and began making her own music in her final year of high school. After dropping out of a communications degree at the Auckland University of Technology after two weeks, during what she called "a quarter-life crisis", she decided to enter the music business professionally. Her music caught the attention of Josh Fountain, a producer and member of the band Leisure, with whom she worked on both her 2017 debut single "Tough Guy" and her 2018 single "Soaked". As Bene, she earned her first career entry on the Triple J's Hottest 100 of 2018 with "Soaked" at #58.

2018–2019: Fire on Marzz and Stella & Steve
In February 2019, Benee supported Lily Allen for an Auckland show during her No Shame Tour. Under the moniker of "Bene", released her debut EP Fire on Marzz on 28 June 2019, before later adding an "e" because of "pronunciation woes", and copyright issues. She had signed to Republic Records in early 2019, prior to this release. The EP, which was described by George Fenwick of The New Zealand Herald as "a funky, sun-soaked record", peaked at #13 on the New Zealand Albums Chart and at #75 on the Australian Albums Chart. The EP also earned Benee the award for Best Solo Artist at the 2019 New Zealand Music Awards in November 2019, where she also won awards for Single of the Year with "Soaked", Best Breakthrough Artist and Best Pop Artist.

Benee's follow-up EP, Stella & Steve, was released on 15 November 2019. The EP features the single "Supalonely" featuring Gus Dapperton, which later gained international success in March 2020 after a viral dance challenge accompanied by the song spawned on the online video-sharing platform TikTok. This became her second song to become viral on TikTok after "Glitter" spawned a similar dance challenge in December 2019. Benee also supported American singer-songwriter Conan Gray for nine nights of his Comfort Crowd Tour of North America during December 2019. Benee's singles, "Glitter", "Find an Island", and "Evil Spider" each appeared in the 2019 Triple J Hottest 100 at 19, 25 and 51 respectively.

2020–2021: "Supalonely" and Hey U X 
Benee's first headlining North American tour with support from American singer Remi Wolf was cancelled due to the COVID-19 pandemic. On 31 January 2020, Benee guested on Australian youth broadcaster Triple J's segment Like a Version, where she covered British musician James Blake's "Mile High", in addition to a performance of "Glitter". In June, the song "Supalonely" clocked over 250 million streams shortly before Benee made her television debut performing it on The Tonight Show Starring Jimmy Fallon alongside Gus Dapperton. She also performed the song on The Ellen DeGeneres Show a month later. In July 2020, Benee released the single "Night Garden" featuring American producer Kenny Beats and British musician Bakar, before releasing the single "Snail" amid the COVID-19 lockdowns in August 2020. Also in July, she was announced as Apple Music's Up Next artist for the month of July, becoming the first New Zealand artist with the title.

Benee featured on the track "Afterthought" on Japanese-Australian musician Joji's second studio album, Nectar (2020). In October 2020, Benee was nominated for Best New Artist at the 2020 People's Choice Awards. Benee performed "Supalonely" on the American talk show Late Night with Seth Meyers in October 2020. In October 2020, Benee departed on a headlining tour of New Zealand October 2020, and formed her own record label named Olive, signing Raglan reggae musician Muroki as the label's first artist. On 15 October 2020, Benee announced her debut album, Hey U X, which was released on 13 November 2020. She had prior noted that it would differ musically from her previous releases. In late October 2020, Benee released the single "Plain" featuring Lily Allen and Flo Milli, shortly before she was announced as the winner of the 2020 APRA Silver Scroll Award for the song "Glitter". She also won Best New Zealand Act at the 2020 MTV Europe Music Awards, where she was also nominated for Best New Act and Best Push Act. On 13 November 2020, Hey U X was released, as was a music video for "Kool", which served as its fourth single. She subsequently won Single of the Year (for "Supalonely"), Best Solo Artist and Best Pop Artist for the second consecutive year at the 2020 Aotearoa Music Awards. Shortly after, her manager of four years, Paul McKessar, handed back his Aotearoa Music Award for Manager of the Year after allegations of his sexual misconduct became public. She announced and then rescheduled a regional tour in Aotearoa aka New Zealand in 2021 to 2022. In 2022 she announced her first World Tour.

2022: Lychee

On 4 February 2022, Benee announced the release of her EP Lychee and released the second single "Beach Boy", which she originally teased on her official Discord server on the 25th January 2022. On 25 March 2022, she featured on Triple J's segment Like a Version, where she covered American singer Ariana Grande's song "God Is a Woman", alongside a performance of her song "Never Ending".

Personal life
In an interview for The New Zealand Herald, Benee revealed that she has dyslexia. She also described her childhood experiences with songwriting: throughout school I struggled with writing....I liked creative writing, that was what I loved, but I was always making mistakes, and I was confined to this way that I should write....Songwriting for me was this place where I don't have to be grammatically correct. Learning the craft with [Josh Fountain], when he was sharing all his knowledge – something clicked, and I was just like, I love this. It's a great emotional outlet for me; I just love splashing what I feel on to a track.

Discography

Studio albums

Extended plays

Compilation albums

Singles

As lead artist

As featured artist

Promotional singles

Other charted songs

Guest appearances

Awards and nominations

Tours

Headlining 

 2019 – Australian East Coast tour
 2020 – New Zealand tour
 2022 - Regional New Zealand, "Aotearoa" Tour (Rescheduled) 
 2022 - "World tour"

Supporting 

 Lily Allen – No Shame Tour (2019; one show)
 Conan Gray – Comfort Crowd Tour (2019; nine shows)

Notes

External links 
 Official site
 BENEE on YouTube
 BENEE on Spotify
 BENEE on Twitter
 BENEE on Instagram
 Official BENEE Discord Server

References

Living people
2000 births
21st-century New Zealand women singers
People educated at St Mary's College, Auckland
People from Auckland
Musicians from Auckland
New Zealand contemporary R&B singers
Musicians with dyslexia
APRA Award winners
Republic Records artists
Māori-language singers